Geochloa is a genus of South African plants in the grass family.

 Species
 Geochloa decora (Nees) N.P.Barker & H.P.Linder - Cape Province
 Geochloa lupulina (L.f.) N.P.Barker & H.P.Linder - Cape Province
 Geochloa rufa (Nees) N.P.Barker & H.P.Linder - Cape Province

See also
 List of Poaceae genera

References

Danthonioideae
Poaceae genera
Endemic flora of South Africa